Jane Joseph is a former Trinidadian cricketer who represented the Trinidad and Tobago women's national cricket team.

An all-rounder, Joseph played in all six women's One Day Internationals at the inaugural Women's Cricket World Cup in 1973 in England. Playing in matches against New Zealand, Australia, Jamaica, Young England, the International XI and England, she finished the tournament with a bowling average of 12.16 runs per wicket, the ninth best overall. Her best performance came in the match against Young England, where she took 3 wickets for 7 runs from 10 overs and made 23 not out with the bat.

Prior to the World Cup in February 1971, Joseph played in both Hayward Shield matches for Trinidad – a tri-series against England and Jamaica with Trinidad winning both the two-day games and the tournament. She also played in a 1-day single innings match for South Trinidad against the same touring English women side where she took 2/61 from 9 overs.

References

 

Living people
Trinidad and Tobago women cricketers
Year of birth missing (living people)
Place of birth missing (living people)